Jawn is a slang term local to Philadelphia and the Delaware Valley that may refer to a thing, place, person, or event, substituting for a specific name. Jawn is a context-dependent substitute noun; a noun that substitutes for other nouns. Jawn can be singular or plural. Examples include: "These jawns are expensive!", “Pass me that jawn.”, "That new jawn.", “This jawn is packed.” 

Jawn is believed to be derived from the word "joint". Historically, the city's Black population migrated to the northern part of the city from Alabama, Georgia, and the Carolinas, bringing with them a Southern dialect that carried words such as 'joint'.

Culture
 "Da Jawn" (1996) is a song on Kollage, the debut album of Philadelphian rapper Bahamadia; it features fellow Philadelphian band The Roots.
 In the song "It's All For You" (1997), Mr. Eon of the Philadelphia rap duo The High & Mighty says: "Somewhere in Philly, they call me 'the jawn'".
 In the film Men in Black II (2002), while Agent J is explaining to Agent K that they replaced the car from the first movie, he refers to the car as "that old jawn."
 In the song “November Has Come” (2005), a collaboration between MF DOOM and Gorillaz, the line: “That said, nah, fo'real-a, the Villain on a Gorilla jawn?” appears, where the word “jawn” is used in the place of “song” or “album.”
 In a scene in the 2015 Philadelphia-based feature film Creed, the character Bianca explains to Adonis Creed the meaning of jawn.
Skate Jawn is a skateboard magazine, founded in 2010 in Philadelphia, PA. The original name of the magazine was Skate Jawn Mag Jawn.
 In the song "Routine" by  Wale, Akintimehin states, "Philly women really chillin' with me / Now I really can't stop sayin' jawn." which references his time spent in Philadelphia.
 The documentary Summer of Soul (...Or, When the Revolution Could Not Be Televised), is referred to in the opening credits as "A Questlove Jawn". Questlove originated from Philadelphia.

See also
 Philadelphia English

References

External links

 The Enduring Mystery of ‘Jawn,’ Philadelphia’s All-Purpose Noun
American slang
Culture of Philadelphia